This is a list of players who played at least one game for the Winnipeg Jets of the World Hockey Association (WHA) (1972–1979). For a list of players who played for the Jets in the National Hockey League, see List of Winnipeg Jets (1979–96) players.



A
Mike Amodeo,
Randy Andreachuk,
Bob Ash,
Ron Ashton,
Freeman Asmundson,

B
Ken Baird,
Norm Beaudin,
Alain Beaule,
Thommie Bergman,
Milt Black,
Frank Blum,
Chris Bordeleau,
Wally Boyer,
Gary Bromley,

C
Brian Cadle,
Scott Campbell,
Kim Clackson,
Jim Cole,
Steve Cuddie,

D
Joe Daley,
Bill Davis,
Dave Dunn,

E
Roland Eriksson,

F
Mike Ford,

G
John Gibson,
Rich Gosselin,
Jean-Guy Gratton,
John Gray,
Ted Green,
Danny Gruen,
Bob Guindon,

H
Jim Hargreaves,
Ted Hargreaves,
Anders Hedberg,
Glenn Hicks,
Larry Hillman,
Bill Holden,
Larry Hornung,
Fran Huck,
Bobby Hull,

J
Danny Johnson,

K
Veli-Pekka Ketola,
Dave Kryskow,

L
Dan Labraaten,
Curt Larsson,
Danny Lawson,
Randy Legge,
Bill Lesuk,
Mats Lindh,
Willy Lindstrom,
Barry Long,
Morris Lukowich,

M
Paul MacKinnon,
Markus Mattsson,
Ab McDonald,
Perry Miller,
Lyle Moffat,
Morris Mott,

N
Robbie Neale,
Kent Nilsson,
Ulf Nilsson,

O
Gerry Odrowski,

P
Lynn Powis,
Kelly Pratt,
Rich Preston,

R
Heikki Riihiranta,
Garth Rizzuto,
Dunc Rousseau,
Kent Ruhnke,
Terry Ruskowski,

S
John Shmyr,
Lars-Erik Sjoberg,
Gary Smith,
Ron Snell,
Dan Spring,
Ken Stephanson,
Peter Sullivan,
Bill Sutherland,
Cal Swenson,

T
Paul Terbenche,
Gordon Tumilson,

W
Ernie Wakely,
Ron Ward,
Steve West,
Bob Woytowich,

Y
Dale Yakiwchuk,
Howie Young,

Z
Joe Zanussi,

References
WHA Jets on hockeydb.com

Winnipeg Jets

players